Marc Claude Boileau (September 3, 1932 – December 27, 2000) was a Canadian ice hockey player and coach. He played 55 games in the National Hockey League with the Detroit Red Wings during the 1961–62 season. The rest of his career, which lasted from 1953 to 1973, was spent in the minor leagues, mainly in the Western Hockey League. After his playing career Boileau worked as a coach, and coached the Pittsburgh Penguins of the NHL from 1974 to 1976, and then the Quebec Nordiques of the World Hockey Association (WHA) from 1976 to 1978.

Life and career
Boileau was born in Pointe Claire, Quebec and went on to a successful ice-hockey career as both player and coach. Boileau is the son of Rose-Berthe Pilon and former NHL player René Boileau, who played for the New York Americans in the 1925–26 season.

Boileau began his playing career with Verdun Lasalle in 1950–51 before moving on to the St. Jerome Eagles the following year. At the age of 20 he moved up to Major Junior Hockey and spent half the 1952-53 season playing for the Montreal Junior Canadiens of the QJHLs. The second half of that season he finished with the Kitchner-Waterloo Greenshirts.

He signed his first professional contract in 1953 and played with the Cincinnati Mohawks for the 1953–54 season. He played with an assortment of minor-league teams for eight years before finally getting the chance to perform in the NHL.

Known for his determined work ethic but also for his temper, Boileau was an established minor league fixture, playing with the Indianapolis Chiefs, Seattle Totems, Hershey Bears, Los Angeles Blades, and Fort Wayne Komets. He retired from playing in 1973 at age 40 with over 1000 games of minor league experience.

Boileau played one season in the National Hockey League. It was in 1961–62 when Boileau played 55 games with the Detroit Red Wings. He was told to concentrate primarily on his defensive duties. He also scored five goals and eleven points. Despite a relatively strong on-ice performance, the Red Wings were unable to find a roster spot for him beyond that season and he never played in the NHL again.

He continued his career as a head coach, beginning with the Fort Wayne Komets, winning the Turner Cup in the 1972–73 season. Boileau went on to become head coach of the NHL's Pittsburgh Penguins from 1973 to 1976. He won the Avco Cup as head coach of the Quebec Nordiques in the World Hockey Association in 1977. He finished his U.S. coaching career with the Flint Generals from 1978 to 1981. Marc went on to coach in The Netherlands (Kemphanen Eindhoven and Tilburg Trappers) and France (Amiens Gothiques) to finish his career.

Personal life
Boileau was married to Yolande Therese Bastien from 1953 until her death in 1989. They had 5 children, Maryse Juliette, Claude Marc, Jean, Pierre Bernard, and Luc Dalton.

Career statistics

Regular season and playoffs

Coaching record

References

External links
 

1932 births
2000 deaths
Canadian ice hockey coaches
Detroit Red Wings players
Fort Wayne Komets players
French Quebecers
Hershey Bears players
Ice hockey people from Quebec
Indianapolis Chiefs players
Kitchener Greenshirts players
Los Angeles Blades (WHL) players
People from Pointe-Claire
Pittsburgh Penguins coaches
Quebec Nordiques coaches
Seattle Breakers coaches
Seattle Thunderbirds coaches
Seattle Totems (WHL) players
Cincinnati Mohawks (IHL) players